Ravi Kinagi (alternative spellings: Rabi Kinagi, Rabi Kinnagi) is an Indian film director, editor, and screenwriter. He works in Bengali and Odia cinema.

Biography
Ravi Kinagi was born into a Kannada family. He learned the basics of filmmaking from his father Shankar Kinagi who was a producer and director. He was born and brought up in Mumbai. He worked with Rajshri Films when they were making Paheli, Naiyya, and Kanoon Ka Shikar. He also assisted S Ramanathan, Anil Ganguly, and Prashant Nanda. He then directed two Marathi films, Manuski and Halahal. Later he started making Odia films. His first Odia film Manini was said to be the first Silver Jubilee film in Odisha. He finally shifted to the Bengali film industry where he has made numerous successful films over the years. He speaks seven languages — Kannada, Hindi, English, Marathi, Gujarati, Odia, and Bengali.

Filmography

As director

Screenplay
 Bhalobasa Bhalobasa

Odia film

References

External links
 

Living people
Bengali film directors
Odia film directors
Film directors from Kolkata
20th-century Indian film directors
Artists from Mumbai
Year of birth missing (living people)